Surendra Nath Singh is an Indian politician and was a member of 17th Legislative Assembly of Uttar Pradesh of India. He represented the Bairia constituency in Ballia district of Uttar Pradesh and is a member of the Bharatiya Janata Party but switched to Vikassheel Insaan Party to fight the 2022 Uttar Pradesh Legislative Assembly Elections.

Early life and education
Singh was born 1 October 1962 in Bairiya, Ballia district, Uttar Pradesh to his father Ramnarayan Singh. In 1986, he married Jayamala Singh, they have one son and two daughters. He belongs to Kshatriya community. In 1992, he got degree of Master of Education from Himachal Pradesh University, Himachal Pradesh and in 1994, he received a degree in Master of Arts in Sociology from Veer Bahadur Singh Purvanchal University, Jaunpur.

Political career
Since 2017, he represents Bairiya constituency as an MLA of Bhartiya Janata Party. He defeated Samajwadi Party candidate Jai Prakash Anchal by a margin of 17,077 votes.

Controversy
In April 2018, Surendra Nath Singh defended rape accused Kuldeep Singh Sengar by saying that a mother of three children cannot get raped. In May 2021, he claimed that cow urine will guarantee protection from the novel coronavirus. On 16 October 2019, BJP leader's daughter accused him of harassment for marrying the son of another politician.

Crime
He has 8 criminal cases registered against Surendra Nath Singh as of 2019 and all these cases are under trial.

Posts held

References

Uttar Pradesh MLAs 2017–2022
Bharatiya Janata Party politicians from Uttar Pradesh
Living people
People from Ballia district
1962 births